Stephen Moreno (16 January 1889 – 6 March 1953) was an Australian classical music composer. He was born in Spain.  where he became a novice monk in the Benedictine order. He was ordained in New Norcia, Western Australia. He was a prolific and respected artist.

Mature choral works were published for various ceremonial religious occasions, some with orchestrations for larger ensembles.

Works
 1933 Around the Booree Log (lyrics by Patrick Hartigan aka. O'Brien)
 1914 Field of the cloth of Gold

Recordings
 Spanish serenade for Violin and piano
 2005 New Norcia textures : for trumpet & pipe organ

References

1889 births
1953 deaths
Australian conductors (music)
Australian male composers
Australian composers
20th-century conductors (music)
20th-century Australian male musicians
20th-century Australian musicians